KUCV (91.1 FM) is a radio station licensed to Lincoln, Nebraska.  A member of National Public Radio, it is owned by Nebraska Public Media, and is the flagship station of the Nebraska Public Radio Network (NET Radio).

KUCV signed on for the first time in 1967, originally owned by Union College.  It was the second NPR station in Nebraska.  The Nebraska Educational Telecommunications Commission bought the station in 1989, making it the flagship of its budding statewide public radio network.

References

External links

UCV
NPR member stations
Radio stations established in 1967
1967 establishments in Nebraska